West End Wash is an ephemeral stream or wash in Clark County, Nevada. Its mouth is at its confluence with the Callville Wash of Lake Mead at an elevation  at when Lake Mead is at its full level.

West End Wash was originally a tributary of Callville Wash, known as West Fork Callville Wash, whose confluence with Callville Wash is now under Callville Bay.

References

West End Wash
Rivers of Clark County, Nevada
Lake Mead
Washes of Nevada
West End Wash
Old Spanish Trail (trade route)